Cristiano Salerno (born 18 February 1985) is an Italian former professional road cyclist, who rode professionally between 2006 and 2015.

Major results

2004
 6th Overall Giro della Valle d'Aosta
2005
 3rd Overall Giro della Valle d'Aosta
 5th Piccolo Giro di Lombardia
 6th Gran Premio San Giuseppe
 9th Gran Premio Palio del Recioto
2006
 7th Overall Regio-Tour
2009
 7th Tre Valli Varesine
 10th Trofeo Melinda
2010
 1st Overall Tour of Japan
1st Stages 2 & 5
 5th Overall Tour of Turkey
 7th Overall Giro della Provincia di Reggio Calabria
 9th Overall Giro di Sardegna
2011
 9th Japan Cup
2013
 1st  Mountains classification Volta a Catalunya
2015
 1st Stage 1 (TTT) Giro del Trentino

Grand Tour general classification results timeline

References

External links
Cristiano Salerno at 

1985 births
Living people
Italian male cyclists
People from Imperia
Cyclists from Liguria
Sportspeople from the Province of Imperia